Digging frog may refer to:

 Boreal digging frog (Kaloula borealis), a frog in the family Microhylidae found in Northeast Asia
 Sichuan digging frog (Kaloula rugifera), a frog in the family Microhylidae endemic to China, where it is found in Sichuan and extreme southern Gansu
 Verrucous digging frog (Kaloula verrucosa), a frog in the family Microhylidae known only from the Yunnan–Guizhou Plateau of southwestern China in Sichuan, Yunnan, and Guizhou provinces, but expected to occur in adjacent Myanmar, Laos, and Vietnam

See also
 Digging (disambiguation)
 Frog (disambiguation)

Animal common name disambiguation pages